The Delta do Parnaíba Environmental Protection Area is a federally-administered environmental protection area that covers parts of the coasts of the states of Maranhão, Piauí and Ceará, Brazil.

Location

In Maranhão the Delta do Parnaíba Environmental Protection Area (APA) covers parts of the municipalities of Água Doce do Maranhão, Araioses, Paulino Neves and Tutóia.
In Piauí the APA covers parts of the municipalities of Cajueiro da Praia, Ilha Grande, Luís Correia and Parnaíba. Parnaiba is the second largest city in Piaui state and has an   airport with 2 weekly (Sunday and Wednesday)  flights from Campinas (Sao Paulo) by Azul Linhas Aereas. In 2021,  VoePass airlines together  Gol airlines started  selling tickets (daily flights) to Parnaiba from Fortaleza (Gol 's Hub in the Northeast Brazil) and Teresina (capital of Piaui state).
In Ceará the APA covers parts of the municipalities of Barroquinha and Chaval.

The APA contains the Delta do Parnaíba Marine Extractive Reserve.
To the southeast it adjoins the federal Serra da Ibiapaba Environmental Protection Area.
It adjoins the Lençóis Maranhenses National Park to the north and the Upaon-Açu/Miritiba/Alto Preguiças Environmental Protection Area to the west.

History

The Delta do Parnaíba Environmental Protection Area was created by federal decree on 28 August 1996 to protect the deltas of the Parnaíba, Timonha and Ubatuba Rivers, their fauna and flora and dune complex.
It is classed as IUCN protected area category V: protected landscape / seascape.
The APA aims to protect remnants of alluvial forest and water resources, and to improve the quality of life of the resident populations through guidance and discipline of economic activities.
It also aims to promote ecological tourism and environmental education, and to preserve local cultures and traditions.
It is administered by the Chico Mendes Institute for Biodiversity Conservation.
The management plan was published in 1998.
The consultative council was created on 10 December 2007.

Environment

The interior of the Parnaíba delta contain large fields of mobile dunes, mostly with a NE-SW orientation.
Some are partially stabilized by creepers and shrubs.
The dunes are unstable due to the action of tides, winds and rivers, and to recent movements of the crustal floor.
The driest period is from August to November.

The region is one where the caatinga formations to the east meet cerrado to the southwest and marine systems to the north.
There are high levels of biodiversity, rarity and endemism.
Vegetation includes coastal caatinga, restinga, mangrove and flood zones with carnaúba palms.
Protected species in the APA include red-handed howler (Alouatta belzebul) and smalltooth sawfish (Pristis pectinata).
Threats include conversion of habitat for farming and aquaculture, and uncontrolled extraction of resources.

Notes

Sources

Environmental protection areas of Brazil
Protected areas established in 1996
1996 establishments in Brazil
Protected areas of Maranhão
Protected areas of Piauí
Protected areas of Ceará